The  Tyrrhenian-Adriatic sclerophyllous and mixed forests  is an ecoregion in southern Italy, Sicily, Sardinia, Corsica, the Dalmatian Islands of Croatia, and Malta.

The ecoregion has a Mediterranean climate, and is in the Mediterranean forests, woodlands, and scrub  biome.

Flora
The Tyrrhenian-Adriatic sclerophyllous and mixed forests has six major plant communities.

The Tyrrhenian mixed oak forests are dominated by the sclerophyllous evergreen oak Quercus ilex, Quercus suber and Quercus coccifera, and by deciduous species such as Quercus pubescens, Quercus cerris, Fraxinus ornus, Celtis australis, and Ostrya carpinifolia. The understory of the forest is dominated by maquis shrubs.
Shrublands occur across the ecoregion. The dominant spescies of maquis shrubland are Olea europaea, Ceratonia siliqua, Laurus nobilis, Arbutus unedo, Pistacia terebinthus, Pistacia lentiscus, Myrtus communis, Erica arborea and Nerium oleander. Juniperus phoenicea, Erica scoparia and  Chamaerops humilis grow near near the Tyrrhenian, Arbutus andrachne,  Juniperus oxycedrus and Juniperus macrocarpa grow in Dalmacia. These trees and shrubs often occur in the undestory of evergreen sclerophyllous and pine forests. Low shrubland known as garrigue grows on dry, south facing slopes near the coast.
Some surviving temperate deciduous oak woodlands, mainly of Quercus robur, appear in coastal wetlands on the Italian peninsula and on the island of Corsica. Stone pine Pinus pinea is found on some coastal sand dunes,  maritime pine Pinus pinaster grows on higher altitudes on the island of Corsica and Sardinia.
Berber thuja woodlands occur on the island of Malta and are one of the only populations of Tetraclinis in Europe.
The Southeastern Italian woodlands, in the region of Apulia, contain the oak species Quercus trojana and Quercus macrolepis,   endemic to the Eastern Mediterranean, together with the evergreen holm oak Quercus ilex, kermes oak Quercus coccifera, cork oak Quercus suber, olive Olea europaea, carob Ceratonia siliqua and the deciduous oak Quercus pubescens. The Aleppo pine Pinus halepensis is also found in these woodlands.
The Islands of Dalmatia are dominated by Aleppo pine Pinus halepensis, kermes oak Quercus coccifera and holm oak Quercus ilex with maquis shrubs and deciduous trees Quercus pubescens, Quercus cerris, Carpinus orientalis, Fraxinus ornus, Cotinus coggygria, Paliurus spina-christi, Cercis siliquastrum. A relict and endemic subspecies of pine, Pinus nigra dalmatica, also occurs.

Fauna
Two subspecies of large mammal herbivore, the European mouflon (Ovis aries musimon) and Corsican red deer (Cervus elaphus corsicanus), are endemic to Corsica and Sardinia.

Protected areas
16,489 km² (21%) of the ecoregion is in protected areas.

External links

References

Mediterranean forests, woodlands, and scrub
Ecoregions of Croatia
Ecoregions of Europe
Ecoregions of France
Ecoregions of Italy
Ecoregions of the Mediterranean Basin
 
 
 
 
Palearctic ecoregions
Sclerophyll forests